Petrus Hubertus "Pierre" Massy (3 February 1900 – 3 August 1958) was a Dutch footballer who earned 12 caps for the Dutch national side between 1926 and 1928, scoring three goals, and participated at the 1928 Summer Olympics. He played club football for RVV Roermond.

References

External links
Player profile at FIFA
 Player profile at VoetbalStats.nl

1900 births
1958 deaths
Dutch footballers
Netherlands international footballers
Olympic footballers of the Netherlands
Footballers at the 1928 Summer Olympics
People from Roermond
Association football midfielders
Footballers from Limburg (Netherlands)